Gregory or Greg Walker may refer to:
 Greg Walker (academic), professor of rhetoric and English literature at the University of Edinburgh
 Greg Walker (baseball) (born 1959), former first baseman
 Greg Walker (footballer) (born 1967), former Australian rules footballer 
 Greg Walker (rower) (born 1964), American Olympic rower
 Gregory T.S. Walker (born 1961), American composer, violinist, and guitarist
 Gregory Walker (music), harmonic formula in the Renaissance period
 Greg Walker (politician) (born 1963), Republican politician in Indiana
 Greg T. Walker (born 1951), American bassist
 Gregory Walker, a character in "A Piano in the House"